Samay Raj Thakkar (born 21 March 1966) is an Indian actor and voice actor who specialises in dubbing foreign media in the Hindi language.

Filmography

Animated films

Animated series

Television

Dubbing career
According to Hindi dubbing director of Main Frame Software Communications Ellie Lewis, Samay Thakkar has been voicing various characters in many Hollywood films in Hindi. He is the Hindi dubbing voice of Christian Bale and Ben Affleck's role as Bruce Wayne / Batman in the Christopher Nolan's Batman reboot trilogy. He also voiced Arnold Schwarzenegger and Sylvester Stallone's roles in all of his films as well. He has also dubbed for Ajith Kumar and Vikram in their Tamil language films and for Nagarjuna in his Telugu language films.

Dubbing roles

Live action series

Animated series

Live action films

Indian films

Hollywood films

Animated films

See also
List of Indian dubbing artists

References

1966 births
Living people
Male actors from Maharashtra
Indian male voice actors
Male actors in Hindi cinema
21st-century Indian male actors